In the 1861 Iowa State Senate elections, Iowa voters elected state senators to serve in the ninth Iowa General Assembly. Following the expansion of the Iowa Senate from 43 to 49 seats in 1861, elections were held for 25 of the state senate's 49 seats. State senators serve four-year terms in the Iowa State Senate.

The general election took place in 1861.

Following the previous election in 1859, Republicans had control of the Iowa Senate with 22 seats to Democrats' 21 seats. However, four changes occurred during the eighth general assembly. In the ninth district, Republican Senator Alvin Saunders resigned on May 14, 1861, causing a vacancy in his seat. Republican Leroy G. Palmer succeeded Senator Saunders, holding the seat for the Republicans. In the tenth district, Republican Senator James Falconer Wilson resigned on October 7, 1861, causing a vacancy in his seat. The tenth district seat was left vacant until a special election in 1861. In the fourteenth district, Democratic Senator Andrew Oliphant Patterson resigned on May 14, 1861, causing a vacancy in his seat. Republican Joseph A. Green succeeded Senator Patterson, flipping the seat to Republican control. In the thirty-fifth district, Republican Senator Thomas Drummond resigned on May 14, 1861, causing a vacancy in his seat. Republican Joseph Dysart succeeded Senator Drummond, holding the seat for the Republicans. Therefore, by election day in 1861, the Republicans held 22 seats, the Democrats held 20 seats, and one seat was vacant (the seat that had been held by Republican Senator James F. Wilson).

To claim control of the chamber from Republicans, the Democrats needed to net five Senate seats.

Republicans maintained control of the Iowa State Senate following the election with the balance of power shifting to Republicans holding 33 seats and Democrats having 16 seats (a net gain of 11 seats for Republicans).

Summary of results 
 Note: The holdover Senators not up for re-election are not listed on this table.

Source:

Detailed results
NOTE: The Iowa General Assembly does not provide detailed vote totals for Iowa State Senate elections in 1861.

See also
 Elections in Iowa

References

External links
District boundaries were redrawn before the 1861 general election for the Iowa Senate:
Iowa Senate Districts 1860-1861 map
Iowa Senate Districts 1862-1863 map

Iowa Senate
Iowa
Iowa Senate elections